The 19th Bangladesh National Film Awards, presented by Ministry of Information, Bangladesh to felicitate the best of Bangladeshi Cinema released in the year 1994. The ceremony took place in Dhaka and awards were given by then President of Bangladesh. The National Film Awards are the only film awards given by the government itself. Every year, a national panel appointed by the government selects the winning entry, and the award ceremony is held in Dhaka. 1994 was the 19th ceremony of National Film Awards.

List of winners
This year artists received awards in 23 categories.

Merit Awards

Technical Awards

Special Awards
 Special Award - Ashish Kumar Loh (posthumous)
 Best Child Artist (Special) - Hosne Ara Putul (Aguner Poroshmoni)

See also
Meril Prothom Alo Awards
Ifad Film Club Award
Babisas Award

References

External links

National Film Awards (Bangladesh) ceremonies
1994 film awards
1995 awards in Bangladesh
1995 in Dhaka